Interbay may refer to:

 Interbay, Seattle, a neighborhood within the City of Seattle, Washington, United States
 Interbay (Tampa), a neighborhood within the City of Tampa, Florida, United States